Postal may refer to:

Places 
 The Italian name for Burgstall, South Tyrol in northern Italy
 Postal, Missouri
 Postal Square
 Postal Museum (Liechtenstein), a postal museum in Vaduz, Liechtenstein

People 
 Fred Postal, former co-owner of the Washington Senators of the American League
 Paul Postal (born 1936), American linguist

Arts and entertainment 
 Postal (franchise), a series of computer games launched in 1997
 Postal (video game), first entry in the series
 Postal (film), a 2007 Uwe Boll-directed film based on the Postal computer game
 Postal (comics), a comic book series written by Matt Hawkins and Bryan Hill

Other uses 
 Postal code
Postal service, mail

See also
 Going postal (disambiguation)
 Postal Act (disambiguation)
 Postal Bank (disambiguation)
 Postal abbreviation (disambiguation)
 Postal inspector (disambiguation)
 Postal service (disambiguation)
 Postal strike (disambiguation)